Yaroslava Shvedova and Tamarine Tanasugarn are the defending champions, but Shvedova chose not to participate this year.
Tanasugarn partnered up with Marina Erakovic and they won in the final 7–5, 6–1, against Anna Chakvetadze and Ksenia Pervak.

Seeds

Draw

Draw

External links
Main Draw

Doubles
PTT Pattaya Open - Doubles
 in women's tennis